The Fort Frances Royals were a Junior ice hockey club from Fort Frances, Ontario, Canada. The Royals were members of the Memorial Cup-eligible Thunder Bay Junior A Hockey League.

History
The Fort Frances Royals were founded in 1963 as members of the Manitoba Junior Hockey League.  After a season playing against all Manitoba opponents, the Royals elected to transfer to the Thunder Bay Junior A Hockey League.  They were the first team in decades to play in the TBJHL without existing within what would eventually become the City of Thunder Bay.

The Royals folded mid-season in 1969 after a terrible start to the season.  Up to this point, the Royals were a force to reckon with in the TBJHL despite never winning a league title.

In 1970-71, the Royals entered the 1971 Centennial Cup playdowns as an independent team.  They were defeated 3-games-to-none by the Thunder Bay Marrs in the Northwestern Ontario final.

Season-by-season standings

Notable alumni
Danny Johnson 

Ice hockey teams in Ontario
Sport in Northern Ontario
Fort Frances
Defunct ice hockey teams in Canada
1963 establishments in Ontario
1970 disestablishments in Ontario
Ice hockey clubs established in 1963
Sports clubs disestablished in 1970
Hockey Northwestern Ontario